The 2000 ICC KnockOut Trophy was a One Day International cricket tournament held in Kenya (which helped to increase the popularity of cricket in Kenya). New Zealand were crowned champions and cashed the winner's cheque of US$250 000. It was their first win in a major ICC tournament. Zaheer Khan, Yuvraj Singh and Marlon Samuels made their ODI debuts during the competition.

All the test playing nations participated in the tournament along with the leading Associates Bangladesh and hosts Kenya. As there were 11 teams taking part, three would miss out on a spot in the quarter finals. Therefore, a playoff stage took place between 6 of the lowest ranked teams.

Pre-Quarter-Finals
All the test playing nations participated in the tournament along with the leading Associates Bangladesh and hosts Kenya. As there were 11 teams taking part, three would miss out on a spot in the quarter finals. Therefore, a playoff stage or Pre-Quarter-Finals took place between 6 of the lowest ranked teams.

Quarter Final Squads

Knockout stage
The knockout stage of the 2000 ICC KnockOut Trophy, following the Pre-Quarter-Finals, was held from 7 to 15 October 2000. The top 5 teams ranked according to 1999 Cricket World Cup seedings qualify for the KnockOut Stage automatically. The remaining three teams qualify from the Pre-Quarter-Finals, which was held from 3 to 5 October, between 6 of the lowest ranked teams according to 1999 Cricket World Cup seedings.

Of the eight teams entering the stage, the team which was ranked 1st according to 1999 Cricket World Cup seedings play the winner of Pre-Quarter-Final 1 while the team which was ranked 2nd according to 1999 Cricket World Cup seedings play the winner of Pre-Quarter-Final 2 and so on, in the format '''R1 v PQF 1, R2 v PQF 2, R3 v PQF 3 and R4 v R5.

Australia, Pakistan, South Africa, New Zealand and Zimbabwe qualify for the knockout stage automatically, while India, Sri Lanka and England qualify from the Pre-Quarter-Finals by beating Kenya, West Indies and Bangladesh respectively.

India, Pakistan, New Zealand and South Africa qualified for the semi-finals by beating Australia, Sri Lanka, Zimbabwe and England respectively. In the semi-finals, New Zealand beat Pakistan and India beat South Africa to qualify for the Finals.

Quarter-finals

Australia v India

Pakistan v Sri Lanka

New Zealand v Zimbabwe

South Africa v England

Semi-finals

New Zealand v Pakistan

India v South Africa

Final

The final of the 2000 ICC KnockOut Trophy took place on 15 October 2000 at the Gymkhana Club Ground in Nairobi, Kenya. It was played between India and New Zealand. New Zealand won the final by four wickets to win their first ICC KnockOut Trophy, their first win at an ICC event.

Background
The 2000 ICC KnockOut Trophy started on 3 October and was hosted by Kenya, all the matches were played at Gymkhana Club Ground, Nairobi, Kenya. Eleven teams participated in the tournament, the top 5 teams ranked according to 1999 Cricket World Cup seedings qualify for the KnockOut Stage automatically. The remaining three teams qualify from the Pre-Quarter-Finals, which was held from 3 to 5 October, between 6 of the lowest ranked teams according to 1999 Cricket World Cup seedings. The final was played on 15 October 2000 and was a day-nighter contested between India and New Zealand at the Gymkhana Club Ground.

It was New Zealand's first Finals appearance at major ICC events. They had previously lost the semi-finals on four occasions between 1975 and 1999. India played in their second final at major ICC events, having played and won the 1983 Cricket World Cup Final.

Route to the final

KnockOut Stage
A total ten matches were played in the tournament. The top 5 teams ranked according to 1999 Cricket World Cup seedings qualify for the KnockOut Stage automatically. The remaining three teams qualify from the Pre-Quarter-Finals, which was held from 3 to 5 October, between 6 of the lowest ranked teams according to 1999 Cricket World Cup seedings. Australia, Pakistan, South Africa, New Zealand and Zimbabwe qualified for the KnockOut Stage automatically, while India, Sri Lanka and England qualified from Pre-Quarter-Finals beating Kenya, West Indies and Bangladesh respectively. India faced Australia, Sri Lanka faced Pakistan and England faced South Africa in the quarter-finals. India, Pakistan, New Zealand and South Africa defeated Australia, Sri Lanka, Zimbabwe and England respectively in the quarter-finals, and qualified for the semi-finals.

Semi-finals
The first Semi-Final was played between New Zealand and Pakistan on 11 October 2000 at Gymkhana Club Ground, Nairobi, Kenya. Pakistan, who had won the toss, elected to bat first. Pakistan were bowled out for 252. Saeed Anwar scored 104 runs from 115 balls. Shayne O'Connor take a five-wicket haul his match figures were (5/46) bowling 9.2 overs, which help the New Zealand team to bowl out Pakistan for such mediocre score. New Zealand innings did start well losing their 2 wickets for 15, but Roger Twose and Craig McMillan steady the innings and put a brilliant partnership of 135 runs facing 158 balls and thus, they achieved the target with an over and 4 wickets remaining. Shayne O'Connor was awarded Man of the Match for his match figures (5/46) and New Zealand entered in their first ever Finals at major ICC events.

India played South Africa in the second Semi-Final of the tournament on 13 October 2000 at Gymkhana Club Ground, Nairobi, Kenya. India captain, Sourav Ganguly won the toss and decided to bat first. Indian openers gave them a steady start, with 66 for no wicket in 14 overs. Sourav Ganguly scored a brilliant century scoring 141 runs facing 142 balls he was not out throughout the innings and India scored the mammoth total of 295 runs losing 6 wickets. South African openers could not give their team a good start as both Kirsten and Hall were back in the pavilion for just the score of 23 in 4 overs and soon they were reduced to 50/4 then Jonty Rhodes, Mark Boucher and Lance Klusener steadied the innings for some extent but that could not help too much as they were bowled out for 200 and lost the match by 95 runs. Sourav Ganguly was named the Man of the Match for his brilliant knock of 141 runs.

Umpires
The match was umpired by West Indies' Steve Bucknor and England's David Shepherd. Sri Lankan Ranjan Madugalle was the match referee and Australia's Darrell Hair was the third umpire.

Details
New Zealand won the toss and elected to field. Indian openers gave a superb start to their team, and put a brilliant partnership of 141 and scoring the runs at the run rate of over 5 runs per over, but then, their middle could not take any advantage of the start given by their openers and finished the innings scoring 264 runs and losing 6 wickets in their allotted 50 overs. Sourav Ganguly's golden run in the tournament continued as he yet again scored a brilliant century scoring 117 runs from 130 balls. New Zealand innings yet again did not start well as they lost their 2 wickets inside 6 overs for the score of 37, and later reduced to 132/5 but then, Chris Cairns and Chris Harris put a brilliant partnership of 122 runs which help them to win their first major ICC event and also their first ICC KnockOut Trophy title.

External links
 Cricinfo tournament home

 
2000
2000 in cricket
International cricket competitions from 1997–98 to 2000
Kenyan cricket seasons to 1999–2000
Sport in Nairobi
International cricket competitions in Kenya
2000 in Kenyan cricket